Barbara Bonfiglio, better known as Misstress Barbara (the misspelling is an intentional portmanteau [i.e. "miss" and "stress"]), is an Italian-born Canadian producer, DJ and singer-songwriter. Born in Catania, Italy, she moved to Montreal, Quebec, Canada at the age of eight and has resided in the city ever since. She has DJed around the globe and has an extensive discography as a producer.

Career
She holds a Bachelor of Arts in Communications from the Université du Québec à Montréal. After drumming in bands since the age of twelve, she began DJing in 1996 and established record label Relentless in 1999. In 2001 she released the mix album Relentless Beats Vol. 1 (Moonshine Records), with a second volume the following year, along with two mix albums for Trust the DJ. In 2003, to avoid legal issues with a Relentless Records, UK company of the same name, she established ITURNEM. Early success includes her song "Never Could Have Your Heart" being licensed in Rockstar Games' arcade racing video game Midnight Club II. In 2006, she released the mix album Come with Me....

In 2009 she released the debut artist album as a singer, I'm No Human, which was nominated for a 2010 Juno Award for Best Dance Recording of the Year, and included the single "I'm Running", featuring fellow Montreal musician Sam Roberts. The album also features collaborations with Brazilian Girls and Bjorn Yttling of Peter Bjorn and John. "I'm No Human" was born out of unhappy circumstances, sparked by the death of a close family member features Misstress Barbara step from behind the turntables in front of the microphone and was recorded in her home town of Montreal. To perform songs from the album, she created a new live band and draws from her experience in electronic music infusing it with live instruments. The live show debuted at Le Festival International de Jazz de Montréal 2009, to a sold out crowd at Montreal's Club Soda. In July 2010, Misstress Barbara performed for the second year in at row at Le Festival International de Jazz de Montréal.

In April 2012, she released her second album Many Shades of Grey which is, unlike her first album, more of a stand-alone project, with the song "The Right Time" as the first radio single. The live show Many Shades of Grey was nominated for Best Show in "Other" Language at Quebec's ADISQ. In July 2012, she sang her single "The Right Time" at Parliament Hill during Canada Day celebrations and later in that same month she was back at Le Festival International de Jazz de Montréal, at La Société des Arts Technologiques (SAT), to perform her new live show Many Shades of Grey.

Discography

Albums
 I’m No Human – Maple Music / Iturnem (Canada) – May 2009
 Many Shades of Grey – Maple Music / Iturnem (Canada) – April 2012 – #91 CAN

EPs
 Steps Towards Comprehension – Tronic (Sweden) – March 1999
 April – Countdown 2000 (Sweden) – April 1999
 Auger Lyer (International Artists EP) – Intec (England) – August 1999
 Sagittarius – Zync (Sweden) – September 1999
 Endless Passion – Iturnem/Relentless (Canada) – October 1999
 Foreign Textures Vol. 1 (by Misstress Barbara & Christian Smith) – Primevil (England) – November 1999
 First Reality – Rotation (England) – November 1999
 Cry & Dry – Iturnem/Relentless (Canada) – December 1999
 Royal Comfort (by Foreign Textures: Misstress Barbara & Christian Smith) – Tronic (Sweden) – January 2000
 Barbara Brown presents: Dammelo, Mi Piace – Strive (Sweden) – February 2000
 For All There's Left – Iturnem/Relentless (Canada) – April 2000
 Relentless Desire – Primate (England) – June 2000
 Zero ID – Zero ID (England) – December 2000
 Barbara Brown presents: Il Minestrone – Primary (England) – December 2000
 Naked Thoughts – Default (Canada) – February 2001
 Emotions on Plastic – Choice (France) – February 2001
 666FVW – Primevil (England) – February 2001
 Effet Karma – Iturnem/Relentless (Canada) – April 2001
 Growing Pains – Iturnem/Relentless (Canada) – November 2001
 Barbara Brown presents: No More Boundaries, This Ain’t House! – Primary (England) – March 2002
 Misstress Barbara VS Barbara Brown Vol. 1 – Iturnem/Relentless (Canada) – September 2002
 Misstress Barbara VS Barbara Brown Vol. 2 – Iturnem (Canada) – March 2003
 In Da Mooda Da Nite – Iturnem (Canada) – May 2004
 Gloria Grande – Iturnem (Canada) – August 2004
 On Fire (by Misstress Barbara & Carl Cox) – April 2005 – 23rd Century (England)
 Come With Me… – Iturnem (Canada) – April 2006
 K–10 / Azzurri – Bedrock (England) – October 2006
 Barcelona – Border Community (England) – February 2007
 Don’t Leave / Come Back – Iturnem (Canada) – May 2007
 Triangle of Love – Iturnem (Canada) – October 2010
 Finally Mine (H.O.S.H. feat. Misstress Barbara) – Diynamic (Germany) – November 2010
 Tu Seras Mon Roi – Iturnem (Canada) – February 2011
 Et Il Bat – Iturnem (Canada) – March 2011
 The Right Time (Rogers Cup Instrumental Mix) – Iturnem (Canada) – August 2011
 Tenno 5 (part of the Ground Under Ibiza 1 compilation) – Bedrock (England) – July 2014
 Sir G / Mrs G – Tulipa (US) – September 2014
 Zia / Closer – Tronic (Sweden) – March 2015
 Je Suis Charlie – Loose (Italy) – April 2015
 Need That / Do It Again – Tronic (Sweden) – July 2015
 I Feel It / Lied to You – Transmit (US) – September 2015
 Burning (part of the 15 Years of Terminal M – A Sides Vol. 2 compilation) – Terminal M (Germany) – December 2015
 Eyes Wide Shut – Kombination Research (England) – May 2016
 Quarantine (part of the Sonar OFF week compilation) – Tronic (Sweden) – June 2016
 The Right Time (Rogers Cup 2016 Mix) – Iturnem (Canada) – July 2016
 Storm Waves – Alleanza (Malta) – August 2016
 Don't Tease Me – Intec Digital (England) – September 2016
 If You Can't Be Mine (Drumcomplex & Misstress Barbara) – Complex LTD (Germany) – October 2016
 Ivory – Xerie (Spain) – November 2016
 The Right Time (Rogers Cup Epic Mix) – Iturnem (Canada) – Aug 2019
 My Mind Off You – Riot Recordings (Italy) – Aug 2019

Remixes
 "Fusion" (Foreign Textures) – Primevil (England) – November 1999
 "Glass" (G–Force) – Genetic (Belgium) – October 2000
 "Dashboard" (Mhonolink) – Zync Rmxd (Sweden) – November 2000
 "Midnight Magik" (Punisher) – Seismic (US) – March 2001
 "Optical Way" (Rino Cerrone) – Iturnem/Relentless (Canada) – January 2002
 "Torso" (Vintage) – X–Trax (Netherlands) – June 2002
 "Yul Fuka" (Yaz, Miko and Preach) – Iturnem/Relentless (Canada) – November 2002
 "Dogzilla" (Simon Patterson & Richie Kayvan) – Maelstrom (England) – August 2003
 "No War in the Summer" (DJ Preach) (Barbara Brown Remix) – Iturnem (Canada) – September 2003
 "Chances" (DJ Hansz) – Body & Artform (Netherlands) – December 2003
 "Aurelon" (Vince Watson) – Bio (Scotland) – June 2004
 "Julian" (Olivier Klitzing) – Headline (Germany) – March 2005
 "Work It!" (Ignition Technician) – Notorious North (England) – April 2005
 "No Works of Words" (T21) – Productions Spéciales (France) – June 2006
 "We Know You Know It" (Foreign Islands) – Deaf Dumb and Blind (US) – November 2006
 "One Eye on the Strawberries" (Pheek) – Iturnem (Canada) – November 2007
 "Club Thing" (Yoav) – Island Records (England) – August 2008
 "Love at the End of the World" (Sam Roberts) – Universal (Canada) / Rounder Records (England) – September 2008
 "2nd to None" (Umek) – Rekluse (England) – May 2010
 "Quinchos" (Llydo) – Dilek (Switzerland) – November 2010
 "Phénix" (Alfa Rococo) – Tacca (Canada) – November 2012
 "Deux Ils Deux Elles" (Lara Fabian) – Musicor (Canada) – September 2013
 "Frog Pond" (Giorgos Gatzigristos) – Tulipa (US) – August 2014
 "Sewers" (The YellowHeads) – Reload Black (Spain) – December 2015
 "Vortex" (Spartaque) – Tulipa (US) – June 2016
 "Mute" (BenMen) – Electropical (France) – March 2018
 "Rouge à Lèvres" (Mehdi Bahmad) – Renaissance (Canada) – Apr 2019

Compilations
 Relentless Beats Vol. 1 – Moonshine (US) – Feb 2001
 MB01 – Trust the DJ (England) – Dec 2001
 Relentless Beats Vol. 2 – Moonshine (US) – Feb 2002
 MB02 – Trust the DJ (England) – Nov 2002
 White Is Pure 2 (by Barbara Brown) – Aria (Canada) – Mar 2003
 Iturnem in Pink – Florida 135 (Spain) – Jan 2004
 Come With Me… – UWE (France) – Feb 2006

Awards and nominations

See also
 List of Quebec musicians
 List of Quebec record labels
 Music of Quebec
 Culture of Quebec
 Disc jockey
 List of Italian Canadians

References

External links
 
 
 

1975 births
Living people
Italian emigrants to Canada
Canadian DJs
Canadian dance musicians
Canadian electronic musicians
Canadian house musicians
Canadian record producers
Canadian singer-songwriters
Canadian techno musicians
Women DJs
Musicians from Montreal
Université du Québec à Montréal alumni
Electronic dance music DJs
21st-century Canadian women singers
Canadian women record producers